Aksel Madsen (29 July 1899 – 15 December 1988) was a Danish long-distance runner. He competed in the marathon at the 1928 Summer Olympics.

References

External links
 

1899 births
1988 deaths
Athletes (track and field) at the 1928 Summer Olympics
Danish male long-distance runners
Danish male marathon runners
Olympic athletes of Denmark
People from Morsø Municipality
Sportspeople from the North Jutland Region